Major General Leven Cooper Allen (March 29, 1894 – September 27, 1979) was an officer in the United States Army during World War II.

Early life
Leven Cooper Allen was born on March 29, 1894, in Fort Douglas, Utah. Before his military service, he attended the University of San Francisco from 1912 to 1916.

Military career

Allen was commissioned in 1916 and was stationed in France. He graduated from the Command and General Staff School in 1931 and the Army War College in 1935. Allen served in the General Staff of the War Department from May, 1941 to February, 1942. Following serving in the General Staff, he held the position of commandant at the Infantry School until  October, 1943. During 1942, Allen served as brigadier general and major general. From 1943 to 1945, he served as chief of staff of the 12th Army Group (formerly the First Army Group). For his actions during World War II, Allen was given two Army Distinguished Service Medals.

His wartime promotion to major general was made permanent on January 23, 1948. His last assignment before his December 31, 1951 retirement was as chief of staff of the 8th Army in Korea.

Later life
Allen lived in Washington, D.C. after retirement and died at Walter Reed Army Hospital on September 27, 1979. He is buried at the United States Military Academy Post Cemetery.

Honors and awards
Allen was the recipient of the Distinguished Service Medal with two Bronze Oak Leaf Clusters, the Legion of Merit with one Bronze Oak Leaf Cluster, the Bronze Star Medal, the Purple Heart and the Air Medal.

Family
Allen married Helen Townsley, the daughter of General Clarence P. Townsley, on April 11, 1928 in Washington, D.C. His older brother Lt. Col. Gilbert M. Allen was the best man and Helen's older sister Marian was the maid of honor. They had a daughter and two grandchildren.

References

External links

United States Army Officers 1939–1945
Generals of World War II

1894 births
1979 deaths
University of San Francisco alumni
Military personnel from Utah
United States Army Infantry Branch personnel
United States Army personnel of World War I
United States Army Command and General Staff College alumni
United States Army War College alumni
United States Army generals of World War II
Recipients of the Legion of Merit
United States Army generals
Recipients of the Distinguished Service Medal (US Army)
United States Army personnel of the Korean War
Recipients of the Air Medal
Military personnel from Washington, D.C.
Burials at West Point Cemetery